A Royal Badge for Wales was approved in May 2008. It is based on the arms borne by the thirteenth-century Welsh prince Llywelyn the Great (blazoned quarterly Or and gules, four lions passant guardant counterchanged), with the addition of St Edward's Crown atop a continuous scroll which, together with a wreath consisting of the plant emblems of the four countries of the United Kingdom, surrounds the shield. The motto which appears on the scroll, PLEIDIOL WYF I'M GWLAD ("I am true to my country"), is taken from the National Anthem of Wales and is also found on the Welsh designs for £1 coins minted from 1985 until 2000. The badge formerly appeared on the covers of Assembly Measures; since the 2011 referendum, it now appears on the cover of Acts passed by the Senedd and its escutcheon, ribbon and motto are depicted on the Welsh Seal.

The current badge follows in a long line of heraldic devices representing Wales. Its predecessors have all been variations on either the Red Dragon, an ancient emblem revived by Henry VII, or the arms of Llywelyn. Whereas the arms of England, Scotland and Ireland are represented in the Royal Arms of the United Kingdom, Wales has no such representation due to its having been annexed and incorporated into the Kingdom of England; therefore Wales had no status as a nation within the Kingdom of England, and the succeeding United Kingdom. The badge has been referenced as a coat of arms for Wales with its use by the Welsh Parliament in acts and laws.

Following the death of Queen Elizabeth II, the design of King Charles III's royal cypher was announced on 27 September 2022, which featured the Tudor crown rather than the St Edward’s Crown. According to the College of Arms, it is envisioned that the Tudor crown will now be used in representations of the royal arms and on crown badges.

History

Arms of native Prince of Wales: Llywelyn the Great

All these kings and princes were ascribed personal coats of arms, often retrospectively if they lived before the dawn of heraldry as it is currently known, and these were borne by their descendants in Wales. The two principal Welsh kingdoms were those of Gwynedd, in the north, and Deheubarth in the south. Of these, the more successful, and the last, finally, to fall, was that of Gwynedd, and the arms now borne by the Princes of Wales as an inescutcheon since 1910 are the historic arms of the dynasty of Gwynedd as borne by the last native Princes of Wales, including Llywelyn the Great and Llywelyn ap Gruffudd. These arms have the blazon Quarterly Or and Gules, four lions passant guardant counterchanged, armed and langued Azure. 

A daughter of Llywelyn the Great was Elen the Younger ferch Llywelyn, Countess of Fife and (by her second marriage) Countess of Mar. Her daughter Isabella of Mar married Robert, the Bruce, King of Scots and had one child by him, Marjorie Bruce, who was the mother of the first Stewart monarch, Robert II of Scotland. His direct descendant, James VI of Scotland became also King of England as James I, and is the direct ancestor of every subsequent English monarch, including Queen Elizabeth II, who is thereby (and through other lines also) the direct lineal descendant of Llywelyn the Great.

Arms of the English/British Princes of Wales 

When in 1911 the future King Edward VIII was made Prince of Wales, a warrant exemplifying his arms was issued. Along with the usual royal arms differenced by a "label" of three points, his main coat of arms included an "inescutcheon surtout" crowned with the heir apparent's coronet and containing the arms of Llywelyn of Gwynedd to represent the principality of Wales.

It is unclear whether, before this date, they were thought of as the "arms of Wales" or simply as the "arms of Llywelyn". But they had certainly not previously been used by heirs to the English or British thrones; indeed, in his 1909 book A Complete Guide to Heraldry, Arthur Charles Fox-Davies had written: "It is much to be regretted that the arms of HRH The Prince of Wales do not include...any allusion to his dignities of Prince of Wales or Earl of Chester." The only allusion, before this innovation, to Wales in the royal arms had been the inclusion, among many other badges, of on a mount vert a dragon rouge – the royal badge on which the present flag of Wales is based.

In the 1960s, A banner of the principality's arms, defaced with an inescutcheon of his heraldic coronet, was introduced for the Prince of Wales's use in Wales.

In 2007 the Presiding Officer of the National Assembly for Wales entered into discussions with the Prince of Wales and the College of Arms regarding a grant of arms for official use by the assembly. A new royal badge designed by the Garter King of Arms, Peter Gwynne-Jones, was granted in 2008 based on the arms of Llywelyn.

Badges with the Welsh dragon

Henry VII had the red dragon of Cadwaladr ap Cadwallon depicted on his royal standard, overlaid on a green and white field (the livery of the Tudor family) when he marched through Wales on his way to Bosworth Field. His standard bearer Sir William Brandon was killed by Richard III on the battlefield. After the battle, the standard was carried in state to St Paul's Cathedral to be blessed.

During his reign Henry VII also appointed William Tyndale or Tendale a royal pursuivant called the Rouge Dragon Pursuivant. The badge of this office was a red dragon on a green mount.

The red dragon did not become an official royal heraldic badge until 1800, when George III issued a royal warrant confirming the badge, blazoned as: On a mount Vert a dragon passant with wings elevated Gules.

There is a further badge for Wales, belonging to the Princes of Wales since 1901, of the red dragon on a mount but with a label of three points Argent about the shoulder to difference it from the monarch's badge. (A similar label of three points is used in his arms, crest and supporters for the same reason.)

Augmentation of Honour
In 1953 the badge was given an augmentation of honour. The augmented badge is blazoned: Within a circular riband Argent fimbriated Or bearing the motto Y DDRAIG GOCH DDYRY CYCHWYN ("the red dragon inspires action"), in letters Vert, and ensigned with a representation of the Crown proper, an escutcheon per fesse Argent and Vert and thereon the Red Dragon passant. Winston Churchill, the prime minister at the time, detested the badge's design, as is revealed in the following Cabinet minute from 1953:

In 1956 this badge was added to the arms of the Welsh capital city Cardiff by placing it on collars around the necks of the two supporters of the shield. The badge was the basis of a flag of Wales in which it was placed on a background divided horizontally with the top half white and bottom half green. In 1959 Government use of this flag was dropped in favour of the current flag at the urging of the Gorsedd of Bards.

The badge was used by the Welsh Office and its successor the Wales Office until January 2017. It was used in the interim logo of the National Assembly for Wales until the "dynamic dragon" logo was adopted.

Other symbols

See also
 Welsh heraldry
 Welsh Seal
 National symbols of Wales
 Honours of the Principality of Wales
 Flag of Saint David

References

External links

National symbols of Wales
Wales
Coats of arms with crowns
Coats of arms with roses
Coats of arms with lions